Studio e.go! was a Japanese eroge company which used to produce fantasy games of various genres for computers, including role-playing video games, SRPGs, and visual novels. The cutscenes of these games were illustrated by Kazue Yamamoto.

Some products were officially translated to Traditional Chinese for distribution in Taiwan between 1999 and 2001. Since these games were being marketed for all ages in Taiwan, the erotic scenes inside the story were modified or deleted. Taiwan Symbio (信必優多媒體) was the official distributor of the Chinese versions.

On March 17, 2009, amidst preparations for the company's 10th anniversary celebrations, Kazue Yamamoto announced that she was leaving the company. This announcement was followed by the departure of all of the remaining staff two days later.

Kazue Yamamoto founded a new company called Debo no su seisakujo (でぼの巣製作所) The company uses a fat sparrow named "Debo" (でぼ, "plump") as its mascot.

Game List

PC Games

PS2 Games

Dreamcast Games 
On (unknown date, date needed) a "Coming Soon" message was put up on the Company's Website announcing that the company was going to release some games for Dreamcast in the near future. Although three games were supposed to be released as per the initial announcement, only 2 were released, both on 22 January 2004.

Castle Fantasia: Seima Taisen 
Izumo

Adaption of Games into other Media
Most of the Company's games were adapted into an anime series or OVA, though some of them were never licensed.

In Order of Release they are:

Izumo The Best: Complete Edition (Aired on TV Between 25 January 2003 to 25 October 2004. Two years later, on 25 January 2005, Izumo - The Complete Edition was released )
Castle Fantasia: Seima Taisen (Aired on TV Between 25 January 2003 to 25 October 2004)
Wind of Ebenbourg
Izumo: Takeki Tsurugi no Senki (Aired on TV Between 3 April 2005 to 19 June 2005)
Angel's Feather

Other Products
The merchandise, released by the company as supplements to their games, is very varied, ranging from their own OST games (Most of these were composed by Angel Note and the Openings and Endings of some these Games were performed (and in some cases, written) by Candy) to Artbooks and Fanbooks of the games.

Some of these fanbooks were produced for and published by other companies, and in most of the cases, not for Studio e.go itself.

Sub-Companies
There were two sub-companies of Studio E.go!, one of them was Blue Impact, a Boy's Love (BL) Game producer and publisher, which made Angel's Feather, which is still producing White Shadow, and which was the publisher of Working Days in 2001.

Some of its releases were:

White Shadow
Angel's Feather~Mono Hot Springs~(Tentative)
Angel's Feather -Kuro no Zanei- (The PS2 Version of The Original Game. Rated 15+)
Angel's Feather -Kohaku no Hitomi- (This was the 18+ Version of the Original Angel's Feather)
Angel's Feather (This release was rated 15+)

The other sub-branch of the company is Cool Beans (KU-RUBI-NZU) 「くーるびーんず] which is the developer and publisher of the OSTs and CD Dramas of Studio E.go! and Blue Impact Games, a subdivision of the original company.

Some of its releases were:

Kagura Souenshu (神楽奏演集)
Amakagura & Jankagura Original SoundTrack(天神楽・雀神楽 オリジナルサウンドトラック)
Studio E.go! Vocal Collection Vol.1
Studio E.go! Vocal Collection Vol.2
Men at Work! 1~4 Complete Soundtrack Collection (オリジナルサウンドトラック 「メンアットワーク！」1～4 コンプリート！)
Izumo 2 Original Soundtrack Collection CD Complete Box (Izumo 2 猛き剣の閃記 キャラクターソング＆ドラマCD Complete Box)

Other releases
These were published before the release of IZUMO 2 Original Soundtrack Collection CD:COMPLETE BOX.

IZUMO2 猛き剣の閃記 キャラクターソング＆ドラマCD vol.4
IZUMO2 猛き剣の閃記 キャラクターソング＆ドラマCD vol.3
IZUMO2 猛き剣の閃記 キャラクターソング＆ドラマCD vol.2
IZUMO2 猛き剣の閃記 キャラクターソング＆ドラマCD vol.1
IZUMO & IZUMO 2 Original Soundtrack

References

External links
Studio ego! Official Website 
 
 
Debo no su Seisakujo Official Website 

Video game companies established in 1998
Video game companies of Japan
Amusement companies of Japan
Eroge